Elia Luini (born 23 June 1979) is an Italian rower.  A four-time world champion, once in the lightweight quadruple sculls and three times in the lightweight double sculls, he has also competed at four Olympic Games (2000, 2004, 2008 and 2012), winning the silver medal in the men's lightweight double sculls at the Sydney Olympics with Leonardo Pettinari.

References

External links
 
 

1979 births
Living people
Italian male rowers
Olympic silver medalists for Italy
Rowers at the 2000 Summer Olympics
Rowers at the 2004 Summer Olympics
Rowers at the 2008 Summer Olympics
Rowers at the 2012 Summer Olympics
Olympic rowers of Italy
Olympic medalists in rowing
World Rowing Championships medalists for Italy
Medalists at the 2000 Summer Olympics
Mediterranean Games bronze medalists for Italy
Mediterranean Games medalists in rowing
Competitors at the 2013 Mediterranean Games
20th-century Italian people
21st-century Italian people